"I Dreamt I Dwelt in Harlem" is a 1941 jazz and pop song recorded by Glenn Miller and His Orchestra. The song was released as a 78 single on RCA Bluebird by Glenn Miller.

Background
The music was written by composer and arranger Jerry Gray, Ben Smith, and Leonard Ware. The lyrics were written by Robert B. Wright, the pseudonym of Buddy Feyne, who also wrote the lyrics to "Tuxedo Junction". The instrumental was recorded on January 17, 1941 in the studio, but had been previously performed live during a November, 1940 NBC radio remote broadcast from the Cafe Rouge, Hotel Pennsylvania, in New York City. The instrumental features a trumpet solo by Billy May. The arrangement was by Jerry Gray. The band performed the song live for radio broadcast on November 4, 18, 20, 23, 1940 and on December 28, 1940. "I Dreamt I Dwelt in Harlem" was recorded a month before Duke Ellington recorded "Take the 'A' Train" on February 15, 1941.

The November 23, 1940 Saturday night live radio broadcast from the Cafe Rouge in Hotel Pennsylvania was introduced by announcer Alan Robinson: "Glenn Miller's finale this evening, something that he cooked up to fit in with his ideas about Lenox Avenue, "I Dreamt I Dwelt in Harlem'." In 1987, Lenox Avenue was co-named Malcolm X Boulevard.

The single, released as an RCA Bluebird A side 78, B-11063-A, reached number three on the Billboard Best Sellers charts on April 5, 1941, staying for five weeks on the charts. The B side was "A Stone's Throw from Heaven". The recording was also released as a 78 single in the UK in October, 1943 on His Master's Voice as B.D. 5817 featuring "Sun Valley Jump" as the B side.

The recording appeared on the 1989 compilation collection Glenn Miller: The Popular Recordings, 1938-1942, a career retrospective on
Bluebird, RCA, and BMG as 9785-2-RB in a 3 CD and a 4 disc vinyl boxed set LP format released in the U.S., Europe, and Germany.

Personnel
The personnel on the 1941 Glenn Miller studio recording were: Dale McMickle, Ray Anthony, John Best, Billy May (tp), Glenn Miller, Paul Tanner, Jimmy Priddy, Frank D'Annolfo (tb), Hal McIntyre, Wilbur Schwartz (cl, as), Ernie Caceres (as, bar), Tex Benneke, Al Klink (ts), Chummy McGregor (p), Jack Lathrop (g), Trigger Alpert (sb), and Maurice Purtill (dm).

Other recordings
The song was also recorded by the Delta Rhythm Boys, Erskine Butterfield and His Blue Boys on Decca Records with vocals in the U.S. and on Brunswick in the UK, Kenny Graham, Herb Miller and His Orchestra, the Syd Lawrence Orchestra, and the King Sisters. The Delta Rhythm Boys also performed the song with the lyrics in a 1941 soundie or film short by Storyville Films directed by Robert R. Snody. Sheet music was released by Fowler Music in New York to accompany the Glenn Miller and Erskine Butterfield recordings. The Alan Glasscock Orchestra has performed the song live in concert in 2013.

Album appearances
 The Complete Glenn Miller, Vol. 6 (1940-1941), Bluebird RCA, 1975		
 Glenn Miller: The Popular Recordings (1938-1942), Bluebird RCA, 1989
 Glenn Miller: Reader's Digest: His Greatest Hits & Finest Performances, Reader's Digest Music, 1994
 Glenn Miller: Marvellous Miller Magic, Hallmark, 1995
 Glenn Miller: The 100 Greatest Titles, EMI Music Distribution, 2001

References

Sources

Flower, John (1972). Moonlight Serenade: A Bio-Discography of the Glenn Miller Civilian Band. New Rochelle, NY: Arlington House. .
Miller, Glenn (1943). Glenn Miller's Method for Orchestral Arranging. New York: Mutual Music Society. ASIN: B0007DMEDQ
Simon, George Thomas (1980). Glenn Miller and His Orchestra. New York: Da Capo paperback. .
Simon, George Thomas (1971). Simon Says. New York: Galahad. .
Schuller, Gunther (1991). The Swing Era: The Development of Jazz, 1930–1945, Volume 2. New York: Oxford University Press. .

External links
 1941 Glenn Miller and His Orchestra recording on RCA Bluebird recorded January 17, 1941.
 1941 recording by Erskine Butterfield and His Blue Boys recorded April 29, 1941.

Glenn Miller songs
Songs with lyrics by Buddy Feyne
1941 compositions
Instrumentals
Jazz compositions
Songs with music by Jerry Gray (arranger)